The Minnedosa Ethanol Plant is an ethanol plant located in Minnedosa, Manitoba. The plant is owned by Cenovus Energy and produces 130 million litres of ethanol per year. In Canada, ethanol is blended into gasoline. The plant feedstock for the facility is non-food feed-grade wheat purchased from local growers. However, the plant is also capable of using corn as a feed-stock. The feed-stock is milled, cooked, fermented, distilled and dehydrated resulting in ethanol fuel and the remaining waste material is processed into a high protein feed 
supplement.

The new plant came on line in 2008 replacing an older plant on the site that from 1981 had produced 10 million litres of ethanol 
annually.  The plant was constructed by PCL Industrial Constructors

References

Buildings and structures in Manitoba
Alcohol fuel producers
Husky Energy subsidiaries
1981 establishments in Manitoba